Wafaa El Kilani (born on 10 September 1972 in Cairo) is an Egyptian presenter. She has presented many TV interview shows for various Arabic media channels, becoming one of the most popular Arab presenters.

Early life and career
El Kilani was born in Cairo. Her father is a businessman and she has lived in multiple Arab countries. She studied political science at Benghazi University in Libya. She began working with Arab Radio and Television Network in 1997 and moved to Rotana in 2005. She became well known after her work for Without censorship in 2009 on LBC. In 2012, she moved to MBC 1. She has interviewed many Arab celebrities in her shows, such as Adel Emam and Kazem al Saher.

Personal life
In August 2008, she civily married Lebanese journalist Tony Michael in Cyprus, despite her family's opposition because of their different religions. They have two children and divorced in 2016. In May 2017 she married Syrian actor Taim Hasan.

Shows

Awards

References

1972 births
Living people
Egyptian media personalities
University of Benghazi alumni
Egyptian Muslims
Mass media people from Cairo